Thomas W. Malone (born 1952) is an American organizational theorist, management consultant, and the Patrick J. McGovern Professor of Management at the MIT Sloan School of Management.

Biography 
Malone received his BA in applied mathematics, graduating magna cum laude from Rice University. He earned his MS in engineering-economic systems, and his Ph.D. in cognitive and social psychology, both from Stanford University.

After graduation, Malone started his career as research scientist at the Xerox Palo Alto Research Center (PARC), where he was involved in designing educational software and office information systems. In 1983 he joined MIT, where he was appointed Professor of Management at the MIT Sloan School of Management. At MIT, he founded and directed the MIT Center for Collective Intelligence, and co-founded the MIT Initiative called "Inventing the Organizations of the 21st Century".

Malone was a cofounder of three software companies, and has consulted and served as a board member for a number of other organizations. He speaks frequently for business audiences around the world and has been quoted in numerous publications, including Fortune, The New York Times, and Wired.

Work 
Malone's research focuses on how new organizations can be designed to take advantage of the possibilities provided by information technology. At MIT he teaches classes on leadership and information technology.

The past two decades of Malone's research is summarized in his book The Future of Work: How the New Order of Business Will Shape Your Organization, Your Management Style, and Your Life.

Video game design 
In 1980, Malone published papers in the nascent field of video game design. His paper "Toward a theory of intrinsically motivating instruction" was based on his PhD dissertation. Malone's last paper in this field was published in 1987.

Electronic business 
In the 1987 article "Electronic markets and electronic hierarchies" written with Joanne Yates and Robert I. Benjamin, Malone predicted many of the major developments in electronic business over the last decade: electronic buying and selling, electronic markets for many kinds of products, "outsourcing" of non-core functions in a firm, and the use of intelligent agents for commerce.

Publications 
Malone has published over 50 articles, research papers, and book chapters; he is an inventor with 11 patents. Books, a selection:
 Thomas W. Malone Coordination Theory and Collaboration Technology Erlbaum, 2001.
 Thomas W. Malone, Robert Laubacher, and Michael S. Scott Morton. Inventing the Organizations of the 21st Century MIT Press, 2003.
 Thomas W. Malone Organizing Business Knowledge: The MIT Process Handbook MIT Press, 2003.
 Thomas W. Malone The Future of Work: How the New Order of Business Will Shape Your Organization, Your Management Style, and Your Life Harvard Business School Press 2004.
 Thomas W. Malone Superminds: The Surprising Power of People and Computers Thinking Together Little, Brown and Company, 2018

Articles, a selection:
 Malone, Thomas W. "Toward a theory of intrinsically motivating instruction." Cognitive science 5.4 (1981): 333–369.
 Malone, Thomas W., Joanne Yates, and Robert I. Benjamin. "Electronic markets and electronic hierarchies." Communications of the ACM 30.6 (1987): 484–497.
 Malone, Thomas W., and Mark R. Lepper. "Making learning fun: A taxonomy of intrinsic motivations for learning." Aptitude, learning, and instruction 3 (1987): 223–253.
 Malone, Thomas W., and Kevin Crowston. "The interdisciplinary study of coordination." ACM Computing Surveys (CSUR) 26.1 (1994): 87-119.
 Malone, T. W., Crowston, K., Lee, J., Pentland, B., Dellarocas, C., Wyner, G., ... & O'Donnell, E. (1999). Tools for inventing organizations: Toward a handbook of organizational processes. Management Science, 45(3), 425–443.

References

External links

 Thomas W. Malone at MIT

1952 births
Living people
American business theorists
Stanford University alumni
Rice University alumni
Place of birth missing (living people)
MIT Sloan School of Management faculty